Massless free scalar bosons are a family of two-dimensional conformal field theories, whose symmetry is described by an abelian affine Lie algebra. 

Since they are free i.e. non-interacting, free bosonic CFTs are easily solved exactly. 
Via the Coulomb gas formalism, they lead to exact results in interacting CFTs such as minimal models.
Moreover, they play an important role in the worldsheet approach to string theory. 

In a free bosonic CFT, the Virasoro algebra's central charge can take any complex value. However, the value  is sometimes implicitly assumed. For , there exist compactified free bosonic CFTs with arbitrary values of the compactification radius.

Lagrangian formulation 

The action of a free bosonic theory in two dimensions is a functional of the free boson ,

where  is the metric of the two-dimensional space on which the theory is formulated,  is the Ricci scalar of that space. The parameter  is called the background charge.

What is special to two dimensions is that the scaling dimension of the free boson  vanishes. This permits the presence of a non-vanishing background charge, and is at the origin of the theory's conformal symmetry.

In probability theory, the free boson can be constructed as a Gaussian free field. This provides realizations of correlation functions as expected values of random variables.

Symmetries

Abelian affine Lie algebra  

The symmetry algebra is generated by two chiral conserved currents: a left-moving current and a right-moving current, respectively 

which obey .
Each current generates an abelian affine Lie algebra . The structure of the left-moving affine Lie algebra is encoded in the left-moving current's self-OPE, 

Equivalently, if the current is written as a Laurent series  about the point , the abelian affine Lie algebra is characterized by the Lie bracket

the algebra is a direct sum of mutually commuting subalgebras of dimension 1 or 2:

Conformal symmetry  

 
The central charge of this Virasoro subalgebra is 

and the commutation relations of the Virasoro generators with the affine Lie algebra generators are 

If the parameter  coincides with the free boson's background charge, then the field 
 coincides with the free boson's energy-momentum tensor. The corresponding Virasoro algebra therefore has a geometrical interpretation as the algebra of infinitesimal conformal maps, and encodes the theory's local conformal symmetry.

Extra symmetries 

For special values of the central charge and/or of the radius of compactification, free bosonic theories can have not only their  symmetry, but also additional symmetries.

Affine primary fields 

In a free bosonic CFT, all fields are either affine primary fields or affine descendants thereof. Thanks to the affine symmetry, correlation functions of affine descendant fields can in principle be deduced from correlation functions of affine primary fields.

Definition 

An affine primary field  with the left and right -charges  is defined by its OPEs with the currents, 
 
These OPEs are equivalent to the relations 

The charges  are also called the left- and right-moving momentums.

Normal-ordered exponentials of the free boson are affine primary fields. In particular, the field 

is a diagonal affine primary field with momentum . This field, and affine primary fields in general, are sometimes called vertex operators.

An affine primary field is also a Virasoro primary field with the conformal dimension 

The two fields  and  have the same left and right conformal dimensions, although their momentums are different.

OPEs and momentum conservation 

Due to the affine symmetry, momentum is conserved in free bosonic CFTs. At the level of fusion rules, this means that only one affine primary field can appear in the fusion of any two affine primary fields,

Operator product expansions of affine primary fields therefore take the form 
 
where  is the OPE coefficient, and the term  is the contribution of affine descendant fields. OPEs have no manifest dependence on the background charge.

Correlation functions 

According to the affine Ward identities for -point functions on the sphere, 

Moreover, the affine symmetry completely determines the dependence of sphere -point functions on the positions,

Single-valuedness of correlation functions leads to constraints on momentums,

Models

Non-compact free bosons 

A free bosonic CFT is called non-compact if the momentum can take continuous values. 

In this context, a non-compact free bosonic CFT is called a linear dilaton theory. 

A free bosonic CFT with  i.e.  is a sigma model with a one-dimensional target space. 
 If the target space is the Euclidean real line, then the momentum is imaginary , and the conformal dimension is positive . 
 If the target space is the Minkowskian real line, then the momentum is real , and the conformal dimension is negative .
 If the target space is a circle, then the momentum takes discrete values, and we have a compactified free boson.

Compactified free bosons 

The compactified free boson with radius  is the free bosonic CFT where the left and right momentums take the values 

The integers  are then called the momentum and winding number. The allowed values of the compactification radius are  if  and  otherwise. 

If , free bosons with radiuses  and  describe the same CFT. From a sigma model point of view, this equivalence is called T-duality. 

If , the compactified free boson CFT exists on any Riemann surface. Its partition function on the torus  is 

This partition function is the sum of characters of the Virasoro algebra over the theory's spectrum of conformal dimensions. 

As in all free bosonic CFTs, correlation functions of affine primary fields have a dependence on the fields' positions that is determined by the affine symmetry. The remaining constant factors are signs that depend on the fields' momentums and winding numbers.

Boundary conditions in the case c=1

Neumann and Dirichlet boundary conditions 

Due to the  automorphism  of the abelian affine Lie algebra
there are two types of boundary conditions that preserve the affine symmetry, namely

If the boundary is the line , these conditions correspond respectively to the Neumann boundary condition and Dirichlet boundary condition for the free boson .

Boundary states  

The corresponding one-point functions on the upper half-plane  are 

In the case of a non-compact free boson, there is only one Neumann boundary state, while Dirichlet boundary states are parametrized by a real parameter. The corresponding one-point functions are 
 

Conformal boundary conditions  

Neumann and Dirichlet boundaries are the only boundaries that preserve the free boson's affine symmetry. However, there exist additional boundaries that preserve only the conformal symmetry. 

If the radius is irrational, the additional boundary states are parametrized by a number . The one-point functions of affine primary fields with  vanish. However, the Virasoro primary fields that are affine descendants of the affine primary field with  have nontrivial one-point functions.

If the radius is rational , the additional boundary states are parametrized by the manifold .

Related theories and generalizations

Multiple bosons and orbifolds 

From  massless free scalar bosons, it is possible to build a product CFT with the symmetry algebra . Some or all of the bosons can be compactified. 

In particular, compactifying  bosons without background charge on an -dimensional torus (with Neveu–Schwarz B-field) gives rise to a family of CFTs called Narain compactifications. These CFTs exist on any Riemann surface, and play an important role in perturbative string theory.

Coulomb gas formalism  

The Coulomb gas formalism is a technique for building interacting CFTs, or some of their correlation functions, from free bosonic CFTs. The idea is to perturb the free CFT using screening operators of the form , where  is an affine primary field of conformal dimensions . In spite of its perturbative definition, the technique leads to exact results, thanks to momentum conservation. 

In the case of a single free boson with background charge , there exist two diagonal screening operators , where . Correlation functions in 
minimal models can be computed using these screening operators, giving rise to Dotsenko–Fateev integrals. Residues of correlation functions in Liouville theory can also be computed, and this led to the original derivation of the DOZZ formula for the three-point structure constant.

In the case of  free bosons, the introduction of screening charges can be used for defining nontrivial CFTs including conformal Toda theory. The symmetries of these nontrivial CFTs are described by subalgebras of the abelian affine Lie algebra. Depending on the screenings, these subalgebras may or may not be W-algebras.

The Coulomb gas formalism can also be used in two-dimensional CFTs such as the q-state Potts model and the  model.

Various generalizations 

In arbitrary dimensions, there exist conformal field theories called generalized free theories. These are however not generalizations of the free bosonic CFTs in two dimensions. In the former, it is the conformal dimension which is conserved (modulo integers). In the latter, it is the momentum. 

In two dimensions, generalizations include:
 Massless free fermions.
 Ghost CFTs. 
 Supersymmetric free CFTs.

References 

Conformal field theory
String theory